Albert Myles "Ab" Welsh (October 8, 1913 – April 23, 1971) was a Canadian ice hockey player. Welsh was a member of the Saskatoon Quakers who represented Canada at the 1934 World Ice Hockey Championships held in Milan, Italy where they won Gold.

See also
List of Canadian national ice hockey team rosters

References

External links

Canadian ice hockey right wingers
Saskatoon Quakers players
Wembley Lions players
1913 births
1971 deaths
Canadian expatriate ice hockey players in England